Alec Smir (born April 13, 1999) is an American-Jordanian soccer player who plays as a goalkeeper for Colorado Springs Switchbacks on loan from MLS Next Pro club Minnesota United 2.

Career

Youth
Smir attended Greensboro Day School, also playing club soccer for NC Fusion from 2013 to 2017, captaining the team during the 2016 season. He was also selected for training camps with the United States under-18 side. In 2017, he also played with Carolina Dynamo in the USL PDL.

College 
In 2017, Smir committed to playing college soccer at University of North Carolina at Chapel Hill. He redshirted his sophomore season in 2018, but went on to make 68 appearances for the Tar Heels. He was named All-ACC Second Team and United Soccer Coaches All-South Region Second Team in 2020, and All-ACC First Team and United Soccer Coaches All-South Region Second Team in 2021.

During the summer of 2018, Smir also appeared in the PDL for Ocean City Nor'easters, making four regular season appearances.

Professional
On January 11, 2022, Smir was selected 62nd overall in the 2022 MLS SuperDraft by FC Dallas. On March 23, 2022, it was announced that Smir had signed with MLS Next Pro side Minnesota United 2 ahead of their inaugural season. Smir went on to make eight regular season appearances for Minnesota in 2022. He was also the winner of Goalie Wars, part of the MLS NEXT Pro All-Star Skills Challenge at the 2022 MLS All-Star Game on August 10, 2022.

On March 13, 2023, Smir was loaned to USL Championship side Colorado Springs Switchbacks for the 2023 season.

References

1999 births
Living people
American soccer players
Association football goalkeepers
Colorado Springs Switchbacks FC players
North Carolina Fusion U23 players
FC Dallas draft picks
MLS Next Pro players
Ocean City Nor'easters players
People from Greensboro, North Carolina
Soccer players from North Carolina
USL League Two players